Jug-A-Lug is an album by David Murray, released on the Japanese DIW label. Recorded in 1994 and released in 1995, the album features performances by Murray with Olu Dara, Robert Irving III, Bobby Broom, Daryl Thompson, Darryl Jones, Toby Williams and Kahil El'Zabar.

Reception
The AllMusic review awarded the album 3 stars, stating: "If you're seeking David Murray the firebrand tenor, this isn't the place. But if you want some easygoing, funky jazz that retains passion and creativity, Jug-A-Lug is a good bet."

Track listing
All compositions by David Murray except as indicated.
 "Jug-A-Lug" - 6:58
 "Ornette" (El'Zabar) - 9:00
 "The Desegregation Of Our Children" - 10:04
 "A.B. Lib" (Williams) - 5:49
 "Acoustic Octofunk" - 16:40
 "18-H" (Broom) - 6:40
 "I Don't Want It" - 9:27
 "Morning Song" - 6:56

Personnel
David Murray - tenor saxophone, bass clarinet
Olu Dara - cornet
Robert Irving III - synthesizer, organ
Bobby Broom - guitar
Daryl Thompson - guitar
Darryl Jones - bass
Toby Williams - drums
Kahil El'Zabar - percussion

References

1995 albums
David Murray (saxophonist) albums
DIW Records albums